The Derryberry House, also known as Pineview, is a historic mansion in Spring Hill, Tennessee, USA.

History
The two-storey mansion was completed in 1803. It was built for Adam Derryberry and his son Jacob. Later, it was redesigned in the Greek Revival architectural style. By the 1990s, the mansion still belonged to Derryberry's descendants.

Architectural significance
It was listed on the National Register of Historic Places in 1990, and was delisted in 2022.

References

Houses on the National Register of Historic Places in Tennessee
Greek Revival houses in Tennessee
Houses completed in 1803
Houses in Maury County, Tennessee
National Register of Historic Places in Maury County, Tennessee
Former National Register of Historic Places in Tennessee